Northwest Highway may refer to several highways in the United States:

Northwest Highway (Texas)
Northwest Highway (Illinois)